Professional wrestling is a form of athletic theater performance.

Professional wrestling or pro wrestling may also refer to:

 Pro Wrestling (NES video game), 1986
 Pro Wrestling (Master System video game), 1986
 Pro Wrestling Illustrated, a magazine
 Professional Wrestling (role-playing game), a 1977 game from Off the Wall

See also
 :Category:Professional wrestling genres
 Puroresu, professional wrestling in Japan
 Lucha libre, professional wrestling in Mexico